Calhoun Hollow is a valley in Montgomery County in the U.S. state of Missouri.

Calhoun Hollow has the name of John Calhoun, original owner of the site.

References

Valleys of Montgomery County, Missouri
Valleys of Missouri